The 1947 Kent State Golden Flashes football team was an American football team that represented Kent State University as a member of the Ohio Athletic Conference (OAC) during the 1947 college football season. In their second season under head coach Trevor J. Rees, the team compiled a 4–4 record (3–1 against OAC opponents), finished in a tie for fifth place in the conference, and was outscored by a total of 95 to 89. The team played its home games at Memorial Stadium in Kent, Ohio.

Schedule

References

Kent State
Kent State Golden Flashes football seasons
Kent State Golden Flashes football